Thomas Fitzgerald Healy (October 30, 1895 – January 15, 1974) was an American Major League Baseball infielder. He attended the University of Pittsburgh.

References

Major League Baseball infielders
Philadelphia Athletics players
Baseball players from Pennsylvania
1895 births
1974 deaths
Richmond Climbers players
Newark Indians players